Myron Henry "Mike" Wilson Jr. (September 9, 1887 – August 19, 1962) was the principal owner of the Cleveland Indians baseball team of the American League from  through . He was a native of Cleveland. In 1952, Wilson purchased Ellis Ryan's share of the franchise to become president and principal owner. In 1956, Wilson and other minority shareholders sold the Indians to William R. Daley.

Wilson stayed on as team president until his death in 1962 at the Cleveland Clinic in Cleveland, Ohio after a one-month hospitalization. He was 74.

References

Cleveland Indians owners

Major League Baseball owners
Cleveland Indians owners
Cleveland Indians executives
1887 births
1962 deaths